Ken McDonald (born September 16, 1945) is a Scottish former footballer who played as a defender.

Career 
McDonald played in the Eastern Canada Professional Soccer League in 1966 with Hamilton Primos. He was selected to the league's all-star team in his debut season. In 1967, Hamilton joined the National Soccer League, and he featured in the O' Keefe Trophy final against Windsor Teutonia, but Hamilton lost the series. The following season he played in the North American Soccer League with Detroit Cougars. He appeared in 25 matches for Detroit. In 1975, he returned to the NSL to serve as a player-coach for Hamilton Italo-Canadians.

Managerial career 
McDonald was the player-coach for Hamilton Italo-Canadians in the National Soccer League for the 1975 season.

References  

1945 births
Living people
Scottish footballers
Scottish football managers
Association football defenders
Hamilton Steelers (ECPSL) players
Detroit Cougars (soccer) players
Eastern Canada Professional Soccer League players
Canadian National Soccer League players
North American Soccer League (1968–1984) players
Canadian National Soccer League coaches
People from Kilwinning